The Collier gas field is a natural gas field located offshore the Cabo Delgado Province in Mozambique. It was discovered in 2012 and developed by Anadarko Petroleum. It began production that year and produces natural gas and condensates. The total proven reserves of the Collier gas field are around 5 trillion cubic feet (143 km³), and production is slated to be around 50 million cubic feet/day (1.9×105m³).

References

Natural gas fields in Mozambique